At large (before a noun: at-large) is a description for members of a governing body who are elected or appointed to represent a whole membership or population (notably a city, county, state, province, nation, club or association), rather than a subset. In multi-hierarchical bodies, the term rarely extends to a tier beneath the highest division.  A contrast is implied, with certain electoral districts or narrower divisions.  It can be given to the associated territory, if any, to denote its undivided nature, in a specific context.  Unambiguous synonyms are the prefixes of cross-, all- or whole-, such as cross-membership, or all-state.

The term is used as a suffix referring to specific members (such as the U.S. congressional Representative/the Member/Rep. for Wyoming at large). It figures as a generic prefix of its subject matter (such as Wyoming is an at-large U.S. congressional district, at present).  It is commonly used when making or highlighting a direct contrast with subdivided equivalents that may be past or present, or seen in exotic comparators. It indicates that the described zone has no further subsets used for the same representative purpose. An exception is a nil-exceptions arrangement of overlapping tiers (resembling or being district and regional representatives, one set of which is at large) for return to the very same chamber, and consequent issue of multiple ballots for plural voting to every voter.  This avoids plural voting competing with single voting in the jurisdiction, an inherent different level of democratic power.

Examples of a democratic power disparity were found in a small number of states at certain U.S. Congresses, between 1853 and 1967, and in the old lower houses of the United Kingdom and Ireland, whereby certain voters could vote for (and lobby) at-large (whole-state/County) and district(-based) representatives to them, giving zones of plural voting and thus representation contrasting with zones, for the same national assembly, of single voting and representation.  In 1964 the U.S. Supreme Court banned such plural voting for the U.S. Congress (thus banning at-large, whole-state congressional districts which overlap state subdivision congressional districts).

Universal principles apply regardless whether election(s) are for a member at large, or not.
a single seat/position/representative: entails a single-winner voting system;
a panel/slate/group of seats/positions/representatives: involves another system.  It is usually proportional representation (whether in "pure" party-list form, as a party-list proportional tier of a mixed-member or parallel voting system, or STV leading forms), Single non-transferable vote (basic single-choice, multi-member), or block (basic multi-choice, multi-member) voting.

Canada
Some municipalities in Canada elect part or all of their city councils at large. The form of municipal election is widespread in small towns to avoid "them and us" cultural dissociation of dividing them into wards. It is also used in many large cities in Canada. The voting method in all at-large elections and multi-member wards today is Plurality block voting. (In the past, Single transferable voting (STV) was used in 20 Canadian municipalities, either in at-large contests or multi-member wards.)
Notable larger instances are, from west to east:
The main cities of British Columbia: Vancouver, Victoria, Surrey and Richmond (all councillors, at large. They adopt specialist spokesman, executive or committee roles).
St. Albert, Alberta and all other municipalities in Alberta (except Edmonton, Calgary and Wood Buffalo) (all councillors at large)
Portage la Prairie, Manitoba (all councillors at large)
North Bay, Ontario (all councillors at large)
Thunder Bay, Ontario (seven councillors elected in single-member wards, five councillors elected at large)
Timmins, Ontario (four rural wards with one councillor each, one urban ward with four councillors at large)

The three territories: Yukon, Nunavut and the Northwest Territories are federally served in the Parliament of Canada by one at-large Member of Parliament and Senator each.  These have high apportionment but are ethnically diverse and of exceptional geographical size.  Provinces are divided to make up the other 335 electoral districts (ridings or comtés). The ridings are combined into large regions to select the 102 senators, who are appointed.

Israel 

In Israel, elections for the Knesset (the national parliament) are conducted at large by proportional representation from party lists. Election of municipal and town (but not regional) councils are on the same basis.

Netherlands 

In the Netherlands, elections for the House of Representatives (the lower house of the States-General, the national parliament) are conducted at large by proportional representation from party lists.

Philippines 

This manner of election applies to the Senate. All voters can cast twelve votes to refresh half of the senate, namely twelve senators, from a longer list of candidates. The simple tally determines the winners (plurality-at-large voting).

Provinces with smaller populations elect their representative at large. Some cities that has its own congressional district also elect its representatives this way. Most other provinces and a few cities are divided into two or more districts.

Likewise, the Sangguniang Kabataan (Youth Councils), Sangguniang Barangay (Village Councils), Sangguniang Bayan (Municipal Councils) and some Sangguniang Panlungsod (City Councils) elect the other members.  It follows each such true or quasi-local government unit does not in the purest sense elect members at large when analysing their geography as each member co-exists with the others who have territorial overlap, as representing greater or lower-rank districts. The members are in law chosen by the public directly or indirectly. City Council-elected and Sangguniang Panlalawigan (Provincial Board)-elected members are elected such that the city or province may be split into as much as seven districts, then each elects at least two members.

United States
Article One of the United States Constitution provides for direct election of members of the House of Representatives. Indeed it confirms when the state has a single representative, that will be a representative at large.

U.S. House of Representatives

States as at-large congressional districts

 Alaska
 Delaware
 North Dakota
 South Dakota
 Vermont
 Wyoming

Former at-large congressional districts

 Alabama
 Arizona
 Arkansas
 California
 Colorado
 Connecticut
 Florida
 Georgia
 Hawaii
 Idaho
 Illinois
 Indiana
 Iowa
 Kansas
 Kentucky
 Louisiana
 Maine
 Maryland
 Massachusetts
 Michigan
 Minnesota
 Mississippi
 Missouri
 Montana
 Nebraska
 Nevada
 New Hampshire
 New Jersey
 New Mexico
 New York
 North Carolina
 Ohio
 Oklahoma
 Oregon
 Pennsylvania
 Rhode Island
 South Carolina
 Tennessee
 Texas
 Utah
 Virginia
 Washington
 West Virginia

Non-voting at-large congressional districts
 American Samoa
 American Virgin Islands
 District of Columbia
 Guam
 Puerto Rico
 Northern Mariana Islands

Former non-voting at-large congressional districts

 Alabama Territory
 Alaska Territory
 Arizona Territory
 Colorado Territory
 Dakota Territory
 Florida Territory
 Hawaii Territory
 Idaho Territory
 Illinois Territory
 Indiana Territory
 Iowa Territory
 Kansas Territory
 Mississippi Territory
 Missouri Territory
 Montana Territory
 Nevada Territory
 New Mexico Territory
 Northwest Territory
 Oklahoma Territory
 Oregon Territory
 Orleans Territory
 Philippines
 Southwest Territory
 Utah Territory
 Washington Territory
 Wisconsin Territory
 Wyoming Territory

Simultaneous at-large and sub-state-size congressional districts
This is a table of every such instance. It shows the situation applied to a small, varying group of states in three periods. The 33rd Congress began in 1853; it ended two years later.  The 38th began in 1863; the 50th ended in 1889.  The 53rd began in 1893; the 89th ended in January 1967, the final such period.  This was due to the 1964 case of Reynolds v. Sims: the United States Supreme Court determined that the general basis of apportionment must be "one person, one vote."

State elections
As of 2021, ten U.S. states have at least one legislative chamber which uses multi-winner at-large districts:

 Arizona House of Representatives (for all representatives in all sessions)
 New Jersey General Assembly (for all representatives in all sessions)
 South Dakota House of Representatives (for all representatives in all sessions)
 Washington House of Representatives (for all representatives in all sessions)
 Maryland House of Delegates (allowed by law even when not used)
 Idaho House of Representatives (allowed by law even when not used)
 North Dakota House of Representatives (allowed by law even when not used)
 Vermont Senate and Vermont House of Representatives (allowed by law even when not used)
 West Virginia Senate and West Virginia House of Delegates (allowed by law even when not used; will switch to all-single-winner districts for both chambers in 2022)
 New Hampshire House of Representatives (allowed by law even when not used; uses floterial districts which can geographically overlap each other)

In the 1980s, Florida, Hawaii, Illinois, South Carolina, and Virginia all moved entirely from multi-winner districts in either chamber, followed by Alaska, Georgia, and Indiana in the 1990s. After the 2010 United States redistricting cycle, Nevada eliminated their two remaining multi-member senate districts and implemented single-winner districts in both houses. In 2018, West Virginia passed a law switching all remaining multi-winner House of Delegates seats to single-winner districts following the 2020 United States Census.

Local elections
Since passage of the Voting Rights Act of 1965 and lessening of some historic barriers to voter registration and voting, legal challenges have been made based on at-large election schemes at the county or city level, including in school board elections, in numerous jurisdictions where minorities had been effectively excluded from representation on local councils or boards. An example is Charleston County, South Carolina, which was sued in 2001 and reached a settlement in 2004. Its county commission changed to nine members elected from single-member districts; in 2015 they included six white Republicans and three African-American Democrats, where the black minority makes up more than one-third of the population.

In another instance, in 2013 Fayette County, Georgia, which had an estimated 70% white majority and 20% black minority, was ordered by a federal district court to develop single-member districts for election of members to its county council and its school board. Due to at-large voting, African Americans had been unable to elect any candidate of their choice to either of these boards for decades. Such local election systems have become subject to litigation, since enabling more representative elections can create entry points for minorities and women into the political system, as well as providing more representative government. In the late 1980s, several major cities in Tennessee reached settlement in court cases to adopt single-member districts in order to enable minorities to elect candidates of their choice to city councils; they had previously been excluded by at-large voting favoring the majority population. By 2015, voters in two of these cities had elected women mayors who had gotten their start in being elected to the city council from single-member districts.

The town of Islip, New York was sued by four residents in 2018 for violating the Voting Rights Act by maintaining a discriminatory at-large council system. One-third of Islip's population is Hispanic, but only one person of color has ever been elected to a town seat. As part of the settlement reached in 2020, the at-large system will be abolished and replaced by four council districts by 2023.

Some states have passed laws that further discourage the use of at-large districts. For example, the California Voting Rights Act removes one of the criteria required for a successful federal Voting Rights Act challenge, thus resulting in hundreds of cities, school districts, and special districts to move to single member area-based elections.

Some jurisdictions have kept at-large city councils and boards.  The solution adopted by Cambridge, Massachusetts is to elect council officials via proportional representation for all seats.

European Union 
The Conference on the Future of Europe has proposed adding "transnational lists" to the European Parliament, in which a small number of members are elected by the entire European Union at-large from Union-wide party lists. This is among a number of proposed reforms to deepen European integration.

See also
General ticket
Plural district
United States Statutes at Large

References

Further reading

External links
U.S. House of Representatives: House History

United States congressional districts
Constituencies
Elections